was a private junior college in Kumatori, Osaka, Japan. It was established in 1989　as a vocational school, and became a junior college in 2000,abolished in 2011.

External links
  

Japanese junior colleges
Universities and colleges in Osaka Prefecture